Torricella in Sabina is a  (municipality) in the Province of Rieti in the Italian region of Latium, located about  northeast of Rome and about  south of Rieti.

Torricella in Sabina borders the following municipalities: Belmonte in Sabina, Casaprota, Monteleone Sabino, Montenero Sabino, Poggio Moiano, Poggio San Lorenzo, Rieti, Rocca Sinibalda. It is located near the ancient Via Salaria, and in the Middle Ages it was a possession of the Abbey of Farfa.

See also
Monti Sabini

References

Cities and towns in Lazio